Brush Creek is a stream in Crawford and Gasconade counties in the U.S. state of Missouri. It is  tributary to the Bourbeuse River.

The stream headwaters arise in western Crawford County at  just south of Interstate 44 west of Fanning and east of Rosati in adjacent Phelps County. The stream flows northeast under I-44 and turns north adjacent to the Cuba airport. The stream is impounded in the small Indian Lake. Below the Indian Lake dam the stream meanders parallel to and then passes under Missouri Route 19 past Oak Hill and enters southeastern Gasconade County.

Brush Creek was named for the brush lining its course.

See also
List of rivers of Missouri

References

Rivers of Crawford County, Missouri
Rivers of Gasconade County, Missouri
Rivers of Missouri